Superstar K7 is the seventh season of the South Korean television talent show series Superstar K, which premiered on 20 August 2015 on Mnet and aired Thursday nights at 11PM KST. Eliminations are determined in every episode, based on text message votes and online votes that are open to the entire public. The winner of Superstar K7, Kevin Oh received 500,000,000 won (US$470,990), a Jaguar XE, and other benefits. This was the largest prize offered in the history of the show so far, in hopes of regaining their audience share. Yoon Jong-shin, Kim Bum-soo, & Baek Ji-young returned as judges. The season also saw the addition of Sung Si-kyung as a judge following the departure of Lee Seung-chul.

References

External links
 

2015 South Korean television seasons
7